Sidney Siegel (4 January 1916 in New York City – 29 November 1961) was an American psychologist who became especially well known for his work in popularising non-parametric statistics for use in the behavioural sciences.  He was a co-developer of the statistical test known as the Siegel–Tukey test.

Siegel completed a  Ph.D. in Psychology in 1953 at Stanford University.  Except for a year spent at the Center for Advanced Study in the Behavioral Sciences at Stanford, he thereafter taught at Pennsylvania State University, until his death in November 1961 of a coronary thrombosis.

His parents, Jacob and Rebecca Siegel, were Jewish immigrants from Romania.

See also 
 Siegel–Tukey test.

Notes

References 
 Nonparametric Statistics for the Behavioral Sciences, 1956
 Bargaining and Group Decision Making (co-authored with Lawrence E. Fouraker), winning the 1959 Monograph Price of the American Association for the Advancement of Science
 Bargaining Behaviour (co-authoree with Lawrence E. Fouraker).
 A nonparametric sum of ranks procedure for relative spread in unpaired samples, in Journal of the American Statistical Association, 1960 (coauthored with John Wilder Tukey)
 Choice, Strategy, and Utility (completed posthumously by Alberta E. Siegel and Julia McMichael Andrews)
 Bargaining, Information and the Use of Threat (co-authored with Donald L. Harnett), 1961

External links
In Memory of Alberta and Sidney Siegel 

20th-century American psychologists
American statisticians
1916 births
1961 deaths
Scientists from New York City
American people of Romanian-Jewish descent
Center for Advanced Study in the Behavioral Sciences fellows
Mathematicians from New York (state)
Stanford University alumni
Fellows of the American Physical Society
Quantitative psychologists